'Azza is a Palestinian refugee camp. It may also refer to:

 Azza (given name), list of people with the name
 Azza Air Transport, cargo airline based in Khartoum, Sudan